Haplometra is a genus of flatworms belonging to the family Plagiorchiidae.

The species of this genus are found in Europe.

Species:
 Haplometra brevicaeca Timon-David, 1962 
 Haplometra cylindracea (Zeder, 1800)

References

Plagiorchiidae
Plagiorchiida genera